Bagrat Uasyl-ipa Shinkuba (12 May 1917 – 25 February 2004) was an Abkhaz writer, poet, historian, linguist and politician. He studied history and languages of Abkhaz, Adyghe and Ubykh people. A prolific poet, Bagrat Shinkuba published First Songs, his first volume of poetry in 1935. His novel The Last of the Departed is dedicated to the tragic destiny of Ubykh nation, which became extinct along a hundred of years.

From 1953 to 1958, he was chair of the Writer's Union of Abkhazia. From 1958 to 1978 he was the Chairman of the Supreme Council Presidium of the Abkhaz ASSR.

Works
 Bagrat Shinkuba. The Last of the Departed on Adyghe Library
 Иалкаау иоымтакуа, т. 1–2, Akya, 1967–68; в рус. пер. — Избранное. [Предисл. К. Симонова], М., 1976.

References

Bibliography
 Цвинариа В. Л., Творчество Б. В. Шинкуба, Тб., 1970 (in Russian).

External links

 Размышления Баграта Шинкубы
 Не уходи, Апсуа!
 Скончался абхазский поэт Баграт Шинкуба

1917 births
2004 deaths
People from Ochamchira District
People from Sukhum Okrug
Abkhazian writers
Abkhazian politicians
Abkhazian poets
Abkhazian historians
Linguists from Abkhazia
Male poets from Georgia (country)
Tbilisi State University
Linguists from Georgia (country)
Novelists from Georgia (country)
Soviet poets
Soviet novelists
Soviet historians
Soviet male writers
Linguists from the Soviet Union